Woh Main Nahin  is a 1974 Indian Hindi-language film directed by Mohan Segal. It is an adaptation of the 1962 Marathi language play To Mee Navhech, written by Pralhad K. Atre and being acted by Prabhakar Panashikar. Navin Nischol and Rekha in lead role with supporting Shaukat Kaifi, Iftekhar, Rakesh Pandey and Padmini Kapila.

Plot 
The story revolves around Vijay (Navin Nischol) being convicted for forgery/fraud/murder related crimes in a court of Law, where, his trial proceeding is headed by a judge and being charged of all the crimes by the public prosecutor (Iftekhar). Vijay refutes all charges levied onto him and pleads Not-Guilty for all the crimes he has been charged with. He eventually ends up standing up his own case, as defence lawyer seemed to be too timid to save him.
Anjali (Rekha) helps Vijay in the trial proceedings with all her might and wealth and they finally find out that it was the guy in the disguise of Vijay's friend Ranjeet (Rakesh Pandey), who was behind all this plot. This guy resembled Vijay cent percent, hence, all the people mistook Vijay for being the fraudster.

Cast 
 Navin Nischol as Vijay / Salimuddin / Diwakar Ganesh Datar / Daji Shastri / Ashok Paranjape / Baba Radheshyam (Double Role)
 Rekha as Anjali
 Rakesh Pandey as Ranjeet
 Padmini Kapila as Sunanda Datar
 Asha Sachdev as Pamela
 Nazneen as Venu
 Sophia as Sultana
 Manhar Desai as Dwarkadas
 Meena Rai as Mrs. Dwarkadas
 Narendranath as Vishambhar
 Krishan Dhawan as Shaikh Mansoor
 Shaukat Azmi as Mrs. Shaikh Mansoor
 Nadira as Gangu Tai Ghotale
 Chaman Puri as Sunanda's Father
 Dhumal as Subrahmanyam
 Iftekhar as Prosecution Lawyer
 Gajanan Jagirdar as Judge

Songs

References

External links 
 

1970s Hindi-language films
1974 films
Hindi remakes of Tamil films
Indian thriller films
Films scored by Sonik-Omi
Indian films based on plays
1970s thriller films
Hindi-language thriller films